Dezh Gah Rural District is a rural district (dehestan) in Dehram District, Farashband County, Fars Province, Iran. At the 2006 census, its population was 3,232, in 657 families.  The rural district has 10 villages.

References 

Rural Districts of Fars Province
Farashband County